Al-Mulk ("Sovereignty, Kingdom") is the 67th chapter (surah) of the Quran, comprising 30 verses. The surah emphasizes that no individual can impose his will on another; he may only guide and set an example (67:26).

Summary
1-3 Praise to the Almighty, the Creator and Ruler of all things
3-5 The perfection of the works of God, seen in the heavens, glorify him
5 We have adorned the lowest heaven with lamps and have made them missiles with which to pelt the devils; and We have prepared for them the punishment of the raging fire
6-8 Torments of hell prepared for unbelievers
8-11 Infidels shall confess in hell their folly in calling Muhammad an impostor
12 Verily those who fear their Lord unseen will have forgiveness and a great reward.
13-14 God knoweth all things
15-18 God shall destroy unbelievers
19-24 Unbelievers ungrateful to the God who sustains them in life
25-28 They challenged the Prophet to hasten the judgment-day, but they shall dread its approach
29-30 The Merciful the only protector on that day

Placement and coherence with other surahs
The idea of textual relation between the verses of a chapter has been discussed under various titles such as nazm and munasabah in non-English literature and coherence, text relations, intertextuality, and unity in English literature. Hamiduddin Farahi, an Islamic scholar of the Indian subcontinent, is known for his work on the concept of nazm, or coherence, in the Quran. Fakhruddin al-Razi (died 1209 CE),  Zarkashi (died 1392) and several other classical as well as contemporary Quranic scholars have contributed to the studies. The entire Qur'an thus emerges as a well-

connected and systematic book. Each division has a distinct theme. Topics within a division are more or less in the order of revelation. Within each division, each member of the pair complements the other in various ways. The seven divisions are as follows:

This surah belongs to the last (7th) group of surahs which starts from Surah Al-Mulk (67) and runs until the end of the Quran. According to Javed Ahmad Ghamidi: "The theme of this group is Warning the leadership of the Quraysh of the consequences of the Hereafter, and delivering glad tidings to Muhammad (sws) of the supremacy of the truth in Arabia. This theme gradually reaches its culmination through the arrangement of various surahs in this group."

Hadith
The first and foremost exegesis/tafsir of the Quran is found in hadith of Muhammad and while hadith is literally "speech"; recorded saying or tradition of Muhammad validated by isnad; with seerah these comprise the sunnah and reveal shariah and tafsir. Although scholars including ibn Taymiyyah claim that Muhammad has commented on the whole of the Quran, others including Ghazali cite the limited amount of narratives, thus indicating that he has commented only on a portion of the Quran. In either the case, higher count of hadith elevates the importance of the pertinent surah from a certain perspective. This surah holds special place in the sayings as well as practices of Muhammad, which can be observed by these related ahadith.

 Imam Ahmad recorded from Abu Hurayrah that Muhammad said,"Verily, there is a chapter in the Quran which contains thirty Ayat that will intercede on behalf of its reciter until he is forgiven. (It is): 'Blessed be He in Whose Hand is the dominion. (Surah Al-Mulk 67)'"
 Muhammad said, 'There is a surah in the Quran which is only thirty verses. It defends whoever recites it until it puts him into Jannah'
 Anas ibn Malik reported Muhammad as saying, "There is a Surah which will plead for its reciter till it causes him to enter paradise."
 Muhammad said, 'Surah al Mulk is the protector from the torment of the grave'
 Jabir said it was the custom of not to go to sleep until he had read Tabarakalladhi Biyadihil Mulk(Al-Mulk) and Alif Laam Meem Tanzeel (As-Sajda).
 He used to recite Surah As-Sajdah and Surah Al-Mulk (in Arabic) before sleeping.
 Abdullah Ibn 'Abbas reported that Muhammad said, 'It is my desire/love that Surahtul Mulk should be in the heart of every Muslim'
 Ibn Abbas said that one of Muhammad's companions set up his tent over a grave without realising that it was a grave and it contained a man who was reciting the Surah Tabarakalladhi Biyadihil Mulk up to the end. He went and told Muhammad who said, 'It is The Defender; it is The Protector which safeguards from Allah Ta'ala's Punishment'
 Khalid bin Madam said about surat Al Mulk and As-Sajda that these two surahs will fight for their reciter in the grave and will say, 'O Allah! If we belong to Your book, accept our intercession in his favour. In case we do not, get us obliterated. These surahs will spread their wings like birds and will save the person from the torment of the grave.'
 It was narrated that Abd Allah ibn Mas'ud said: Whoever reads Tabarakalladhi Biyadihil Mulk [i.e. Surah al-Mulk] every night, Allah will protect him from the torment of the grave. At the time of the Messenger of Allah, we used to call it al-mani'ah (that which protects). In the Book of Allah it is a surah which, whoever recites it every night has done very well.
 Abdullah ibn Masud is reported to have said, 'A man will be approached in his grave from his legs and from his chest and then from his head. And each time this Surah will defend him by saying, 'You cannot do anything to him, he used to recite Surah Mulk'.'
 Abdullah ibn Masud further states, 'It is called, 'Al-maani'ah'. For it protects from the punishment of the grave.'
 Ibn Umar said that once that Muhammad recited verse 2 (the One Who created death and life so that He may test you as to which of you is better in deeds) and when he reached the words "better in deeds", he stopped and explained that 'better in deeds' is the person who abstains most from the things Allah has forbidden and is always ready to obey Him."
 There is a surah (chapter) in the Quran which consists of thirty verses which will keep interceding about a man until he is forgiven. The Surah is Tabarak Allazi Biyadihi al-Mulk i.e. ‘Blessed is He in Whose Hand is the Kingdome’.
 Yahya related to me from Malik from Ibn Shihab that Humayd ibn Abd ar-Rahman ibn Awf had told him that Surat al-Ikhlas (Sura 112) was equal to a third of the Quran, and that Surat al-mulk (Sura 67) pleaded for its owner.
Surah Mulk has multiple benefits and Virtues, even it is one of the most beneficial chapters of Qur'an spiritually and theoritically.

References

External links
Best Real time Visualization of Surah Mulk with English translation, for non-Muslims
Surah Mulk Benefits
Surah Mulk PDF

Mulk